Bellmore or Bellmores may refer to:

"The Bellmores, New York", a collective term referring to Bellmore and North Bellmore
Bellmore, New York, census-designated place (CDP) in Nassau County, New York, United States
North Bellmore, New York, census-designated place (CDP) in Nassau County, New York, United States
Bellmore, Indiana, unincorporated community in Union Township, Parke County, Indiana, United States
Bellmore station, a train station in Bellmore, New York
6445 Bellmore, an asteroid

See also
 Belmore (disambiguation)
 Bellemore, surname